Ptychadena arnei is a species of frog in the family Ptychadenidae.
It is found in Ivory Coast, Guinea, Senegal, Sierra Leone, possibly Guinea-Bissau, and possibly Liberia.
Its natural habitats are subtropical or tropical moist lowland forest, moist savanna, swamps, intermittent freshwater lakes, freshwater marshes, and heavily degraded former forest.

References

Ptychadena
Taxonomy articles created by Polbot
Amphibians described in 1997